Together is the first and only studio album released by the duo team of American Motown artists Marvin Gaye and Mary Wells. It was released on the Motown label on April 15, 1964. The album brought together the rising star Gaye with Wells, an established star with a number-one pop hit to her name (1964's "My Guy"), singing mostly standards and show tunes, in the hopes that Gaye would benefit from the exposure.

This album became the first charted album credited to Gaye, peaking at number 42 on the Billboard Pop Albums chart and yielding two top 20 singles, "Once Upon a Time" and "What's the Matter with You Baby". Shortly afterwards, Wells, who received bad advice from her former husband and manager, left Motown upon reaching 21. The label had to find another duet partner for Gaye, enlisting Kim Weston for one album, Take Two, also consisting of similar material, but later yielding a longer-lasting pairing of Gaye with Tammi Terrell, with more contemporary material.

Track listing

Personnel
Marvin Gaye – lead vocals
Mary Wells – lead and additional vocals
The Love Tones – background vocals
The Andantes – background vocals
The Funk Brothers – instrumentation

References

1964 albums
Albums produced by Clarence Paul
Albums produced by William "Mickey" Stevenson
Marvin Gaye albums
Mary Wells albums
Motown albums
Vocal duet albums
Albums recorded at Hitsville U.S.A.